The 67th season of the Campeonato Gaúcho kicked off on February 2, 1987 and ended on July 19, 1987. Fourteen teams participated. Holders Grêmio won their 25th title. Novo Hamburgo and São Borja were relegated.

Participating teams

System 
The championship would have two stages.:

 First phase: The fourteen clubs played each other in a double round-robin system. At the end of each round, the four best teams qualified to another double round-robin tournament, the winner of which earned one bonus point to the Final hexagonal. The six best teams in the sum of both rounds qualified into the Final hexagonal and the two teams with the fewest points were relegated.
 Final hexagonal: The six remaining teams played each other in a double round-robin system; the team with the most points won the title.

Championship

First phase

First round

Copa 250 Anos da Cidade de Rio Grande

Second round

Copa Desportista Rubem Moreira

Final standings

Final hexagonal

References 

Campeonato Gaúcho seasons
Gaúcho